Harry Rodermond (3 January 1897 – 29 March 1983) was a Dutch footballer. He played in five matches for the Netherlands national football team from 1921 to 1922.

References

External links
 

1897 births
1983 deaths
Dutch footballers
Netherlands international footballers
Place of birth missing
Association footballers not categorized by position